Rangnekar is a surname. Notable people with the surname include: 

Ahilya Rangnekar (1922–2009), Indian politician
Ajit Rangnekar, dean of the Indian School of Business
Khandu Rangnekar (1917–1984), Indian cricketer
Motiram Gajanan Rangnekar (1907–1995), Marathi writer
Sharif D Rangnekar, communications consultant, journalist, and human rights activist